Richelieu is a 1914 American silent historical drama film written and directed by Allan Dwan, based on the play Richelieu written by Edward Bulwer-Lytton. It featured Lon Chaney, Murdock MacQuarrie and Pauline Bush. This was Allan Dwan's last film for Universal, as he moved to New York afterward to work at the Famous Players Company and married his lead actress Pauline Bush in 1915.

Originally released in March 1914 at six reels in length (making it Chaney's first full-length feature), Universal eventually cut it down to four reels and put it out on Sept. 26, 1914 as part of its regular programme of pictures. Upon viewing the original 6-reel version, Moving Picture World had written in their review, "A six-reel production of the celebrated Cardinal Richelieu, following the lines of the famous play by that name.... The plot is a highly interesting one toward the close, but the action in the first three reels is rather slow and confusing. This would have been much stronger as either a three or four reel production."  The film is now considered to be lost. Neither the 6-reel nor the 4-reel version survives.

Plot
In 17th-century France, Cardinal Richelieu sends Adrien de Mauprat, who is in love with Richelieu's ward Julie de Mortemar, off to fight the Spanish, as punishment for his disobedience in an earlier military conflict. Baradas (Lon Chaney), a favorite of King Louis XVI, is also in love with Julie, and envies de Mauprat's victories when he winds up winning in battle and returning home a hero. Baradas convinces de Mauprat that the cardinal is plotting against him and draws him into a scheme to kill the cardinal and seize the throne. Richelieu learns of the plot and De Mauprat is imprisoned and sentenced to be executed. Julie pleads for the release of her lover and winds up getting permission to marry him, and de Mauprat is released. Baradas is imprisoned instead, Julie winds up marrying de Mauprat, and Richelieu is restored to power.

Cast
 Murdock MacQuarrie as Cardinal Richelieu
 William C. Dowlan as Adrien de Mauprat
 Lon Chaney as Baradas
 Pauline Bush as Julie de Mortemar
 James Robert Chandler as Sieur de Beringhen
 Edna Maison as Marion de Lormer
 James Neill as The King
 Richard Rosson as François 
 Edythe Chapman as The Queen
 William Lloyd as Joseph
 Frank Rice as Huget

Reception
Motion Picture News wrote: "It is hardly necessary to say that (Allan Dwan) has succeeded in really reproducing this section from this momentous and troubling time in France.....Mr. MacQuarrie's portrayal of Richelieu is really a fine piece of acting." Moving Picture World wrote: "This finely photographed four-reel production of "Richelieu", besides being good entertainment, has a pleasing historical interest...The costuming is pleasing throughout this production, the photography is exceptionally smooth and inviting, and the choice of settings admirable."

References

Bibliography
 Frederic Lombardi. Allan Dwan and the Rise and Decline of the Hollywood Studios. McFarland, 2013.

External links

1914 films
1914 lost films
1914 drama films
1910s historical drama films
American silent feature films
American black-and-white films
American historical drama films
Lost American films
Films based on works by Edward Bulwer-Lytton
Films directed by Allan Dwan
Universal Pictures films
Lost drama films
Films set in the 1620s
Films set in the 1630s
Films set in France
Films set in Paris
Biographical films about politicians
Cultural depictions of Cardinal Richelieu
Cultural depictions of Louis XIII
1910s American films
Silent American drama films